Ditiro Nzamani (born 29 January 2000) is a sprinter from Botswana specialising in the 400 metres. He represented his country at the 2019 World Championships without advancing from the first round. Earlier that year he won a gold medal in the 4 × 400 metres relay at the 2019 African Games.

International competitions

Personal bests
Outdoor
400 metres – 45.07 (Yaoundé 2019)

References

2000 births
Living people
Botswana male sprinters
Athletes (track and field) at the 2019 African Games
African Games gold medalists for Botswana
World Athletics Championships athletes for Botswana
African Games medalists in athletics (track and field)